Jeremiah ( –  BC), also called Jeremias or the "weeping prophet", was one of the major prophets of the Hebrew Bible. According to Jewish tradition, Jeremiah authored the Book of Jeremiah, the Books of Kings and the Book of Lamentations, with the assistance and under the editorship of Baruch ben Neriah, his scribe and disciple.

In addition to proclaiming many prophecies, the Book of Jeremiah goes into detail regarding the prophet's private life, his experiences, and his imprisonment.

Jeremiah is an important figure in both Judaism and Christianity. His words are read in synagogues as part of the Haftara and he is quoted in the New Testament. Islam also regards Jeremiah as a prophet and his narrative is recounted in Islamic tradition.

Biblical narrative

Chronology 

Jeremiah was active as a prophet from the thirteenth year of Josiah, king of Judah (626 BC), until after the fall of Jerusalem and the destruction of Solomon's Temple in 587 BC. This period spanned the reigns of five kings of Judah: Josiah, Jehoahaz, Jehoiakim, Jehoiachin, and Zedekiah. The prophetess Huldah was a relative and contemporary of Jeremiah while the prophet Zephaniah was his mentor.

Lineage and early life 
Jeremiah was the son of Hilkiah, a priest from the land of Benjamin in the village of Anathoth. The difficulties he encountered, as described in the books of Jeremiah and Lamentations, have prompted scholars to refer to him as "the weeping prophet".

Jeremiah was called to prophecy  BC by God to proclaim Jerusalem's coming destruction by invaders from the north. This was because Israel had forsaken God by worshiping the idols of Baal and burning their children as offerings to Baal. The nation had deviated so far from God's laws that they had broken the covenant, causing God to withdraw his blessings. Jeremiah was guided by God to proclaim that the nation of Judah would suffer famine, foreign conquest, plunder, and captivity in a land of strangers.

Calling 

According to the Books of Kings and Jeremiah, Josiah's reforms were insufficient to save Judah and Jerusalem from destruction, because of the sins of Manasseh, Josiah's grandfather, and Judah's lustful return to the idolatry of foreign gods after Josiah's death. Jeremiah was said to have been appointed to reveal the sins of the people and the punishment to come.

Jeremiah resisted the call by complaining that he was only a child and did not know how to speak, but the Lord placed the word in Jeremiah's mouth, commanding "Get yourself ready!" The qualities of a prophet listed in Jeremiah 1 include not being afraid, standing up to speak, speaking as told, and going where sent. Since Jeremiah is described as emerging well trained and fully literate from his earliest preaching, his relationship with the Shaphan family has been used to suggest that he may have trained at the scribal school in Jerusalem over which Shaphan presided.

In his early years of being a prophet, Jeremiah was primarily a preaching prophet, preaching throughout Israel. He condemned idolatry, the greed of priests, and false prophets. Many years later, God instructed Jeremiah to write down these early oracles and his other messages.

Persecution 

Jeremiah's prophecies prompted plots against him. Unhappy with Jeremiah's message, possibly from concern that it would shut down the Anathoth sanctuary, his priestly kin and the men of Anathoth conspired to kill him. However, the Lord revealed the conspiracy to Jeremiah, protected his life, and declared disaster for the men of Anathoth. When Jeremiah complains to the Lord about this persecution, he is told that the attacks on him will become worse.

A priest, Pashur the son of Immer, a temple official in Jerusalem, had Jeremiah beaten and put in the stocks at the Upper Gate of Benjamin for a day. After this, Jeremiah laments the travails and mockery that speaking God's word have caused him. He recounts how, if he tries to shut God's word inside, it burns in his heart and he is unable to hold it in.

Conflict with false prophets 
While Jeremiah was prophesying the coming destruction, he denounced a number of other prophets who were prophesying peace.

According to the book of Jeremiah, during the reign of King Zedekiah, the Lord instructed Jeremiah to make a yoke with the message that the nation would be subject to the king of Babylon. The false prophet Hananiah took the yoke off Jeremiah's neck and broke it, prophesying that within two years the Lord would break the yoke of the king of Babylon, but Jeremiah prophesied in return: "You have broken the yoke of wood, but you have made instead a yoke of iron."

Relationship with the Northern Kingdom (Samaria) 
Jeremiah was sympathetic to, as well as descended from, the northern Kingdom of Israel. Many of his first reported oracles are about, and addressed to, the Israelites at Samaria. He resembles the northern prophet Hosea in his use of language and examples of God's relationship to Israel. Hosea seems to have been the first prophet to describe the desired relationship as an example of ancient Israelite marriage, where a man might be polygamous, while a woman was only permitted one husband. Jeremiah often repeats Hosea's marital imagery.

Babylon 
The biblical narrative portrays Jeremiah as being subject to additional persecutions. After Jeremiah prophesied that Jerusalem would be handed over to the Babylonian army, the king's officials, including Pashur the priest, tried to convince King Zedekiah that Jeremiah should be put to death for disheartening the soldiers and the people. Zedekiah allowed them, and they cast Jeremiah into a cistern, where he sank down into the mud. The intent seemed to be to kill Jeremiah by starvation, while allowing the officials to claim to be innocent of his blood. Ebed-Melech, an Ethiopian, rescued Jeremiah by pulling him out of the cistern, but Jeremiah remained imprisoned until Jerusalem fell to the Babylonian army in 587 BC.

The Babylonians released Jeremiah, and showed him great kindness, allowing him to choose the place of his residence, according to a Babylonian edict. Jeremiah accordingly went to Mizpah in Benjamin with Gedaliah, who had been made governor of Judea.

Egypt 
Johanan succeeded Gedaliah, who had been assassinated by an Israelite prince in the pay of Ammon "for working with the Babylonians." Refusing to listen to Jeremiah's counsel, Johanan fled to Egypt, taking with him Jeremiah and Baruch, Jeremiah's faithful scribe and servant, and the king's daughters. There, the prophet probably spent the remainder of his life, still seeking in vain to turn the people back to God. There is no authentic record of his death.

Historicity 
The consensus is that there was a historical prophet named Jeremiah and that portions of the book probably were written by Jeremiah and/or his scribe Baruch.

Views range from the belief that the narratives and poetic sections in Jeremiah are contemporary with his life (W. L. Holladay), to the view that the work of the original prophet is beyond identification or recovery (R. P. Carroll).

First there were early collections of oracles, including material in ch. 2–6, 8–10, 13, 21–23, etc. Then there was an early Deuteronomistic redaction which Albertz dates to around 550 BC, with the original ending to the book at 25:13. There was a second redaction around 545-540 BC which added much more material, up to about ch. 45. Then there was a third redaction around 525–520 BC, expanding the book up to the ending at 51:64. Then there were further post-exilic redactions adding ch. 52 and editing content throughout the book.

Although Jeremiah was often thought of traditionally as the author of the Book of Lamentations, this is probably a collection of individual and communal laments composed at various times throughout the Babylonian captivity. Albertz considers ch. 2 as the oldest, dating shortly after the Siege of Jerusalem (587 BC) and ch. 5 after the assassination of Gedaliah, with the other chapters added later (p. 160).

Religious views

Judaism 
In Jewish rabbinic literature, especially the aggadah, Jeremiah and Moses are often mentioned together, their life and works being presented in parallel lines. The prophet Ezekiel was a son of Jeremiah according to rabbinic literature. In 2 Maccabees 2:4ff the subject is credited with hiding the Ark, incense altar, and tabernacle on the mountain of Moses.

Christianity 
Christian worship services regularly included readings from the Book of Jeremiah. The author of the Gospel of Matthew is especially mindful of how the events in the life, death and resurrection of Jesus fulfill Jeremianic prophecies.

There are about forty direct quotations of the book in the New Testament, most appearing in Revelation 18 in connection with the destruction of Babylon. The Epistle to the Hebrews also picks up the fulfilment of the prophetic expectation of the new covenant.)

Islam 

As with many other prophets of the Hebrew Bible, Jeremiah is also regarded as a prophet in Islam. Although Jeremiah is not mentioned in the Quran, Muslim exegesis and literature narrates many instances from the life of Jeremiah and fleshes out his narrative, which closely corresponds with the account given in the Hebrew Bible. In Arabic, Jeremiah's name is usually vocalised Irmiyā, Armiyā or Ūrmiyā. 

Classical historians such as Wahb ibn Munabbih gave accounts of Jeremiah which turned "upon the main points of the Old Testament story of Jeremiah: his call to be a prophet, his mission to the king of Judah, his mission to the people and his reluctance, the announcement of a foreign tyrant who is to rule over Judah." 

Moreover, some hadiths and tafsirs narrate that the Parable of the Hamlet in Ruins is about Jeremiah. Also, in Sura 17(Al-Isra), Ayah 4–7, that is about the two corruptions of children of Israel on the earth, some hadith and tafsir cite that one of these corruptions is the imprisonment and persecution of Jeremiah.

Muslim literature narrates a detailed account of the destruction of Jerusalem, which parallels the account given in the Book of Jeremiah.

Archaeology

Nebo-Sarsekim tablet 
In July 2007, Assyrologist Michael Jursa translated a cuneiform tablet dated to 595 BC, as describing a Nabusharrussu-ukin as "the chief eunuch" of Nebuchadnezzar II of Babylon.

Seals 
A 7th-century BC seal of Jehucal, son of Shelemiah and another of Gedaliah, son of Pashhur (mentioned together in Jeremiah 38:1; Jehucal also mentioned in Jeremiah 37:3) were found during excavation by Eilat Mazar in the city of David, Jerusalem, in 2005 and 2008, respectively.

Tel Arad ostraca 
Pottery shards at Tel Arad were unearthed in the 1970s that mention Pashhur, and this reference may be to the same individual mentioned in Jeremiah 20:1.

Veneration 
He was first added to Bede's Martyrology.

Feast Day 
 16 January – commemoration of overthrowing the Idols by prophet Jeremiah (OO)
 7 April – Saint Michael delivers Jeremiah from prison (OO)
 30 April – Martyrdom of Jeremiah the Prophet (OO)
 1 May – commemoration in Catholic Church and Eastern Orthodox Church
 26 June – commemoration in LCMS (R)

Liturgical hymns 

Troparion Prophet Jeremias — Tone 2

Проро́ка Твоего́ Иереми́и па́мять, Го́споди, пра́зднующе,/ тем Тя мо́лим:// спаси́ ду́ши на́ша.

Proroka Tvoego Ieremii pamyat’, Gospodi, prazdnuyushche,/ tem Tya molim:// spasi dushi nasha.

Kontakion Prophet Jeremias — Tone 3

Очи́стив ду́хом, вели́кий проро́че и му́чениче,/ твое́ светоза́рное се́рдце,/ сла́вне Иереми́е,/ проро́чествия дар свы́ше прия́л еси́/ и возопи́л еси́ велегла́сно во страна́х:/ се Бог наш, и не приложи́тся ин к Нему́,// И́же, вопло́щся, на земли́ яви́лся есть.

Ochistiv dukhom, veliky proroche i mucheniche,/ tvoe svetozarnoe serdtse,/ slavne Ieremie,/ prorochestviya dar svyshe priyal yesi/ i vozopil yesi veleglasno vo stranakh:/ se Bog nash, i ne prilozhitsa in k Nemu,// Izhe, voploshchsya, na zemli yavilsya yest’.

Cultural influence 
Jeremiah inspired the French noun jérémiade, and subsequently the English jeremiad, meaning "a lamentation; mournful complaint," or further, "a cautionary or angry harangue."

Jeremiah has periodically been a popular first name in the United States, beginning with the early Puritan settlers, who often took the names of biblical prophets and apostles. Jeremiah was substituted for the Irish Diarmuid/Diarmaid (also anglicised as Dermot), with which it has no etymological connection, when Gaelic names were frowned upon in official records. The name Jeremy also derives from Jeremiah.

References

Explanatory notes

Citations

Works cited

Further reading 

 
 
 
 Friedman, Richard E. (1987). Who Wrote the Bible? New York: Harper and Row.
 Heschel, Abraham Joshua (1975). The Prophets. HarperCollins Paperback.

External links 

 
 
 Hirsch, Emil G.; et al., "Jeremiah" The Jewish Encyclopedia (1906).

 
570s BC deaths
6th-century BC writers
6th-century BCE Jews
7th-century BC births
7th-century BC writers
7th-century BCE Jews
Catholic saints
Eastern Orthodox saints
English masculine given names
Jewish priests
Martyrs
Oriental Orthodox saints
Tribe of Levi